Andrew Coburn may refer to:

Andrew Coburn (author) (1932–2018)
Andrew Coburn (catastrophe modeller) (born 1956), catastrophe modeller